Rigo District is a district of Central Province in Papua New Guinea. It is one of the four administrative districts that make up the province.

Local-level government areas

 Rigo Central Rural
 Rigo Coastal Rural
 Rigo Inland Rural

Towns and major villages

See also
 Districts and LLGs of Papua New Guinea

References

Districts of Papua New Guinea